Norbello is a comune (municipality) in the Province of Oristano in the Italian region Sardinia, located about  north of Cagliari and about  northeast of Oristano.

Norbello borders the following municipalities: Abbasanta, Aidomaggiore, Borore, Ghilarza, Santu Lussurgiu.

Demographic evolution

References

Cities and towns in Sardinia
1946 establishments in Italy
States and territories established in 1946